Geographic isolation or other factors that prevent reproduction have resulted in a population of organisms with a change in genetic diversity and ultimately leads to the genetic isolation of species. Genetic isolates form new species through an evolutionary process known as speciation. Today, all the species diversity present on earth is the product of genetic isolate and evolution. The current distribution of genetic differences and isolation within and among populations is also influenced by genetic processes, which can give significant input into evolution's basic principles. The resulting genetic diversity within a species' distribution range is frequently unequally distributed, and large disparities can occur at the series of ranges when population dispersion and isolation are critical for species survival. The interrelationship of genetic drift, gene flow, and natural selection determines the level and dispersion of genetic differences between populations and among species assemblages. Geographic and natural elements may likewise add to these cycles and further impact species' advanced examples of hereditary variety such as genetic differences that cause genetic isolation. Genetic variations are often unequally distributed over a species' geographic distribution, with differences between populations at the geographic center and the range's extremities. In general, significant gene flow occurs in core populations, resulting in genetic uniformity, whereas low gene flow, severe genetic drift, and diverse selection conditions occur in range periphery populations, resulting in enhanced genetic isolation and heterogeneity among populations. Genetic differentiation resulted from genetic isolate occurs as significant alterations in genetic variations, such as fluctuations in allelic frequencies, that are accumulated in the populations over time with geographic regional boundaries. Significant genetic diversity can be detected towards the limits of a species' range, where population fragmentation and isolation are more likely to affect genetic processes. Fragmentation is the division of a large population into smaller, geographically separated habitats, resulting in genetic differences within and across groups is also the product of genetic isolate. Regional splitting is produced by a variety of factors, including environmental processes that regularly change a species' indigenous distribution. Additionally, human-caused environmental changes, such as deforestation, land degradation can result in fast changes in a species' distribution, resulting in population decrease, segmentation, and regional isolation . Consequently, communities became geographically and genetically isolated.

History 
Isolation, in combination with diminishing habitat quality and a limited population density, is likely to result in a population's collapse and ultimate demise and extinction. Random mutation rate, drift, high rates of inbreeding, restricted gene flow, and regional extinction have all been shown to increase with isolation. Varying climatic conditions, such as particular geographic climatic changes, can potentially cause pressures, which can drastically change a species' genetic composition yielding differences through starkly different selection processes. as well as lead to increased genetic isolation among populations on a landscape heterogeneity. Environmental heterogeneity has historically been identified as a vital source of genetic variations and distinctions due to isolation, and several studies have found correlations between neutral genetic differences and ecological heterogeneity, and genetic isolation. The genetic isolation and different associations in regional heterogeneity could be cited as evidence of diversifying selection working across entire genomes, encompassing manifestly neutral genes, and can be used to predict long-term effects of environmental factors on genetic diversity and genetic isolation.

Definition 
Genetic isolation is population of organisms that has little genetic mixing with other organisms within the same species. This may result in speciation, but this is not necessarily the case. Genetic isolates may form new species in several ways:

 Allopatric speciation, in which two populations of the same species are geographically isolated from one another by an extrinsic barrier, and evolve intrinsic (genetic) reproductive isolation
 Peripatric speciation, in which a small group of a population is separated from the main population, and experiences genetic drift
 Parapatric speciation, in which zones of two diverging populations are separate, but do overlap somewhat; partial separation is afforded by geography, so individuals of each species may come in contact from time to time, but selection for specific behaviors or mechanisms may prevent breeding between the two groups.
 Sympatric speciation, a contentious method of speciation in which species diverge while inhabiting the same place.

Human influences on genetic isolates include restricted breeding of dogs, or a community living secluded away from others (such as Tristan da Cunha or Pitcairn Islands). Far larger and less secluded human genetic isolates are peoples like Sardinians or also the Finns, natives of Finland.

Genetic Isolation and the Giraffa camelopardalis 
Genetic isolation can happen in a variety of different ways. There are many ongoing, current research projects evaluating how various species have diverged through the process of genetic isolation, the giraffe, Giraffa camelopardalis, being one example. Giraffes are recognized to have nine separate subspecies, each varying in their coloration and patterns. After much research, it accepts that genetic isolation is at fault for allowing the G. Camelopardalis species to diverge. There are various ideas behind how genetic isolation has occurred within the giraffe species. Extant giraffe populations have been studying to make small-scale migratory movements based on the African climate's wet and dry seasons. The feeding ecology of giraffes is highly researched. It has shown that giraffes will follow the growth patterns of the Acacia tree based upon seasonal change, changing giraffe locations from mountain ranges to desert ranges. Though this is not evidence for current-day genetic isolation, it suggests evidence for past large-scale migrations that may have caused separation within the species, caused genetic isolation and led to the beginnings of the subspeciation of the giraffe population. Giraffes also tend to travel in loose social herds. However, these loose social herds have been researching to be base upon a non-random system. This non-random system follows a trend of kinship or the sharing of similar genes between individuals. These loose-social herds keep kin and familiar individuals within the same group, with only slight movements of individuals from the pack, only to return to the same group. This is evidence for genetic isolation by interaction only between familiar individuals. This is the cause for interbreeding and the accumulation of specific alleles. These alleles could potentially code for pelage color and pattern within a population, causing differences between people and ultimately the subspeciation of the giraffe species. Geographic separation has also been studying to play a role in the genetic isolation of the giraffe. The mitochondrial DNA of the giraffe has been looking for mutations and loci substitutions between subspecies and suggests diversification around the Late Pleistocene, where geographic isolation was likely. The giraffe is an excellent example of how genetic isolation can happen in some ways and lead to species diversification.

Allopatric Speciation 
The giraffe, Giraffa camelopardalis, can represent the allopatric speciation that occurs due to the genetic isolation of a population. Several clades of giraffes show differentiation within their mitochondrial DNA, varying between regions throughout Africa. These differences date back to the middle of the Pleistocene epoch and coincide with genetic isolation due to climatic and geographical separations within the population, allowing for the evolution and subspeciation of the separate subspecies of giraffe and differences in their pelage. In addition, When a species splits into two different groups that are isolated from one another, this is known as allopatric speciation (1).

Genetic isolation and speciation 
A genetic species is a collection of biologically compatible crossbreeding natural populations that are genetically distinct from genetically related populations. The Genetic species concept, in contrast to the biological species concept, emphasizes genetic isolation rather than reproductive separation. The finding of genetically separate but not reproductively isolated species advances our knowledge of biodiversity, speciation, and related issues, as well as organism evolution. Consider the evolution of two allopatric populations. Over lengthy periods, each group undergoes numerous substitutions, resulting in genetic differentiation and isolation. Would it be possible to transplant a divergent gene from one group into the genome of another? On this connected genetic background, it's simple to see the gene being reasonably successful. That's also easy to see how it wouldn't work out because they are now genetically isolated from one another.

Genetic isolation by environment or distance 
Strong gene flow across populations can help local adaptation by bringing new genetic variations for selection, but it can also impede adaptation by clogging up locally beneficial genes. The population size, genetic diversity, and the environment can all have an impact on the outcome. IBD (isolation by distance), wherein population growth rates and immigration numbers are inversely proportional to population distance, may correlate gene flow patterns with geographic distance. Gene flow may also follow patterns of isolation by habitat, with higher rates of gene flow among an increasingly common form. Moreover, gene flow may be greatest across areas that are dissimilar which is the typical genomic swamping situation. When the population’s size is limited and individuals are subjected to strong selection, gene flow can boost population numbers, even if the phenotypes that arise are generally miss-adapted. This can lead to increases in genetic differences that lead to isolation, which can allow new adaptations to take hold and even enlarge a habitat zone.

Genetic isolation in fragmented populations 
The link between statistical genetic differences and population size has gotten little scientific attention, despite the fact that small populations have less genetic variation at marker loci. Researchers show that in smaller fragmented meta-population, both neutral and quantifiable genetic variation is reduced, and both drift and selection change is amplified.

Genetic isolation in sympatric species 
Adaptation to diverse positions climatic conditions could be a significant source of genetic differences and isolation among populations. Pleiotropic induced sexual selection between individuals of these genetically diverse populations can be induced by biological features selected in each habitat. This circumstance could make sympatric speciation easier. For example, successful host transitions in phytophagous insects provide some of the most compelling evidence for ecological diversification in sympatric speciation.

Genetic isolate and the burden of genetic diversity 
Species with enormous ecological amplitudes, on the whole, have a lot of genetic diversity. More specialized species with small ecological amplitude and frequency, on the other hand, have minimal genetic diversity. Inbreeding depressions may pose the greatest threat to species with moderate habitat demands and substantial genetic diversity.

The Influence of dispersal and diet on patterns of genetic isolation 
Gene flow across populations is commonly thought to be a key role in the evolution of both local adaptations and speciation. It is necessary to assess genetic separation by distance to determine the impacts of dispersal ability and food breadth on genetic population structure. Strong dispersers have a mild IBD (isolation by distance) because of the homogenizing effects of gene flow, whereas stationary species have limited gene flow, which permits nearly all populations to isolate. Genetic uniformity is achieved at small geographical scales in intermediate dispersers, whereas limited dispersal increases genetic variability across vast distances. IBD is also thought to rise with decreasing food breadth and no other pattern, putting the theory that specialization promotes speciation by affecting population genetically subdivision to the test. In studies of IBD, the number of populations is more essential than the number of multiple alleles per locus.

Current patterns of genetic isolation on islands 
Individuals from several vegetation types on the island are genetically connected, demonstrating that ecological and climatic factors have a role in determining gene flow configurations on a small island. Climatic differentiation, as a single factor is included as separate variability, provides to decreases in immigration and reproduction in as many species belongs to a wide range of herbs families and with variable amounts of evolutionary understanding. The genetic structure of species on an isolated island is influenced by a range of environmental variables, with some species being influenced by single contours and others being influenced by many species. Sister species and congenerics have various contributing elements to isolation within species.

Advantages 
In most situations, highly specialized species are constrained to a small portion of the accessible environment, characterized by extremely isolated populations. This ecological specialization and consequently geographical constraint of indigenous populations is frequently accompanied by a reduction in gene flow, resulting in small population sizes and genetic differentiation. As a result, due to genetic isolation, such species can only survive if they are suited to minimal genetic isolation. In the search for lethal genes, genetic isolates with a background of a small founding population, long-term isolation, and population bottlenecks are invaluable resources. Specific rare, monogenic disorders get enhanced, and families with numerous sick members become common enough to be employed in locus-identifying linkage analyses. Besides that, the vast majority of cases are caused by the same mutation, and diseased alleles expose linkage of disequilibrium with molecular markers over strong genetic distances, making disease locus recognition easier in small study samples with few individuals affected using a similarity search for a shared genotype. The presence of disequilibrium linkage in disease alleles enhances linkage analysis and aids in determining the precise position of disease locus on the genome sequence.

Disadvantages 
Many species fall somewhere between generalist and specialist on the generalist specialist range. Such species generally exhibit moderate environmental specialization, being neither pure generalists nor pure specialists, resulting in fluid changes that must be subjective when categorizing species. Despite their considerable habitat specialization, environmentally transitional species generally do not exhibit the low genetic diversity seen in pure specialists, but instead, exhibit species-specific genetic differences on the scale with generalists. These taxa, on the other hand, are categorized as far more endangered as their degree of specialization would suggest. This scenario can be harmful in the progression of population decline and may be one of the promoters of extinction in this instance, owing to the genomic instability of populations and unpredictable aggregation of detrimental genes.

Example:

Genetic isolation in the cyclic rodent Microtus avails

Microtus arvalis, a small-sized mouse with short dispersal ranges that achieves relatively high richness, has been used as a model to investigate the effects of roads on genetic diversity and organization in fragmented and competitive habitats. The species' remarkable colonization potential has been observed in recent decades., making it particularly well suited to studying small mammal dispersion strategies over short periods. Furthermore, these mouse populations achieve high local abundances and may endure significant population fluctuations in a few years, with well-defined periods. In comparison to what has been reported for other morphologically similar small mammals with more reasonably expected populations, this species' cyclic variation in population size makes it particularly fascinating to explore the possible sensitivity to road barriers. In a system with considerable population size changes, the lowest population size experiences the highest amounts of genetic drift. As a result, demographic bottlenecks are likely to have a large impact on genetic isolations and variations, reducing variability within populations while increasing variance between them. The enormous population size and gene flow at the highest stages, on the other hand, may lessen the effects of drift and bottlenecks, however, it may take many generations for the species to achieve new equilibrium values.

See also 
 Language isolate
 Linkage disequilibrium

References

Speciation